The Brazilian Institute of Public Opinion and Statistics (IBOPE based on the Portuguese language name, Instituto Brasileiro de Opinião Pública e Estatística) does market research to provide information regarding Brazilian and Latin American markets. IBOPE provides data on media, public opinion, voting intention, consumption, behavior, marketing, branding and other issues as required by clients.

Established in 1942, it is listed in the Honomichl Top 25 Global Research Organizations rating. The name IBOPE is listed in the Brazilian dictionary as a synonym of audience ratings 
research.

History 

IBOPE was created in 1942 by the radio broadcaster Auricélio Penteado, owner of Radio Kosmos in São Paulo. In that year, he decided to apply research methodologies he had learned while studying in the United States under George Gallup, the founder of the American Institute of Public Opinion, in order to quantify the size of the audience of his broadcast in Brazil.
 
When he measured the radio audience in São Paulo, Auricélio proved that Radio Kosmos wasn't among the most listened to stations. Therefore, he would dedicate himself exclusively to research. In 1950, Penteado leaves the presidency of the company in charge to a group of directors.

In 1977, Paulo de Tarso Montenegro became the president of the company. One year later, he invited his children, Carlos Augusto Montenegro and Luís Paulo Montenegro, to join the company. IBOPE carried out the first voting intention polls, anticipating with extreme precision the outcome of electoral contests in the late 1970s.

In the 1990s, IBOPE partners with entrepreneurs in Mexico, Colombia, Venezuela, Ecuador, Peru, Chile and Argentina. From these partnerships, the company begins to supply consolidated data for Latin America cable TV. Currently, in addition to Brazil, the company has offices in 14 countries.

In 2014, the IBOPE Media division (measuring media audience and advertising investment) was sold to the Kantar Group, which changed its name to Kantar Ibope Media.

Measurement 
IBOPE was the first company worldwide to offer the service of TV audience measurement in real time from São Paulo in 1988.

In every city where the audience is measured, IBOPE choose a group of homes at random to represent the population. With the authorization of the family members, each television is equipped with a device called peoplemeter, which identifies and records which channels are being watched.

The device sends, by cell phone system, the information of all changes made by the viewer channel to a central collection of indices that processes, analyzes and distributes to customers.

The system of television audience measurement in real time is used in Brazil, Chile and Argentina.

Top-rated programs
This table lists all the TV shows with the highest average household IBOPE rating for each television season.

 The program with the all-time highest average rating is in bold text 
 Sports programs have italicized rating numbers 
 Two or more programs tie for highest average IBOPE rating in the same season

Divisions
IBOPE Group is composed of four major businesses: IBOPE Media, IBOPE Inteligência, IBOPE Educação and IBOPE Ambiental. Additionally, IBOPE Group works together with partners through strategic partnerships. IBOPE Media is responsible for media research, advertising investment and consumption habits and offers a broad product line that meets the needs of media, advertising agencies and advertisers in 14 Latin American countries.

IBOPE Inteligência provides market, behavior, brand, public opinion and internet research, used by clients to develop business strategies in organization, marketing and products development. Additionally, many organizations use research to broaden innovation.  Research by IBOPE Inteligência gets at the root of issues, offering clients customized and attractive solutions to any business challenge.  In addition to Brazil, the company has offices in Argentina, Chile, México, Puerto Rico and the United States, where IBOPE acquired the American company Zogby International, based in Utica, New York. IBOPE Zogby was subsequently closed at the end of 2012.

IBOPE Educação is in the market of executive education, training professionals involved in strategic decision making. It integrates in its academic content current and exclusive information from the Group, maximizing the potential of contributions to achieving results.

And IBOPE Ambiental is a business unit performing in the environmental area with services aimed at environmental sustainability, was recently launched. The company’s headquarters is in Brazil, but it works in countries in Latin America and Africa.

Moreover, IBOPE has major stakes in two companies: IBOPE Nielsen Online and Millward Brown do Brasil. IBOPE Nielsen Online is a joint venture between IBOPE Media and Nielsen, that details the behavior of internet users. Millward Brown do Brasil is a partnership between IBOPE and Millward Brown, Inc., a WPP Group company, the world leader in advertising, branding and marketing. Millward Brown do Brasil expertise is on demand research for building and maintaining strong brand identity.

The  Group is a collaborator with Instituto Paulo Montenegro, created in 2000 in honor of one of the founders of IBOPE.  The Institute develops and runs educational projects, using the knowledge gathered through research in the 69-year history of IBOPE.

Instability 
In 2009, the IBOPE was under suspicion of a possible blackout in its system on 22 November 2009 at 9:40 at night. At that time, the device that measures real-time audience numbers stopped working, and the Institute accused mobile operators that they were responsible for the alleged breakdown in the system. But companies TIM and VIVO denied the Institute of Public Opinion in a statement to Rede Record, which was most harmed by the fact happened. Since then, the television station determined on its department of communication not to disclose their numbers over the station's audience, as they say in their research methodologically.

Even respecting the client's rights, IBOPE disagreed with these critics made, considering it was a momentary problem. The company's research follows the code of self-regulation and ethics of the ESOMAR - The World Association of Research Professionals, and also follows the code of ethics of Associação Brasileira das Empresas de Pesquisa (ABEP - Brazilian Association of Research Companies)

In Argentina, IBOPE is also under suspicion, regarding its research methodology. The government of President Cristina Kirchner plans to launch a state system of measuring television audience in the country (similar to British BARB), in a clear challenge to IBOPE, which now dominates the Argentine Market. According to the government of the country, the work of IBOPE is not checked by anyone.

However, the work of IBOPE in the area of media research is audited by independent firms, hired by a committee formed by the clients of this service. In Argentina, the audit is made by the Cámara de Control de Medición de Audiencia (CCMA - Chamber of Control of Audience Measurement).

See also 
 Kantar Media
 Brazilian Institute of Geography and Statistics

References 
Notes

Principal

External links 
 Kantar Ibope Media

Public opinion research companies
Market research companies of Brazil    
Audience measurement
Privately held companies of Brazil
Companies based in São Paulo
1942 establishments in Brazil
Companies established in 1942